The Hatfield Plantation is a plantation complex in Brenham, Texas. The National Register of Historic Places has listed it since January 25, 1971.

See also

National Register of Historic Places listings in Washington County, Texas
Recorded Texas Historic Landmarks in Washington County

References

Plantation houses in Texas
Houses in Washington County, Texas
Houses on the National Register of Historic Places in Texas
National Register of Historic Places in Washington County, Texas
Recorded Texas Historic Landmarks